The bicolored tube-nosed bat (Murina bicolor) is a species of vesper bat endemic to Taiwan.

Taxonomy and etymology
It was described as a new species in 2009 by Kuo et al.
The holotype was collected in 2002 in Taroko National Park.
Its species name "bicolor" refers to the difference in pelage color of its dorsal and ventral sides.

Description
It has dark coloration around its muzzle, eyes, and lower forehead, creating the appearance of a "mask."
Its dorsal fur is reddish brown, while its ventral fur is yellowish.

Range and habitat
It is endemic to Taiwan.

Conservation
As of 2017, it is assessed as a least-concern species by the IUCN.
It meets the criteria for this classification because there is no evidence that its population is declining.
Its range also includes protected areas.

References

Murininae
Bats of Asia
Mammals of Taiwan
Mammals described in 2009